Point of No Return was a Broadway play starring Henry Fonda and Frances Bavier. It was written by Paul Osborn, based on the novel of the same name by John P. Marquand.

Prior to its Broadway opening, Point of No Return had its world premiere in New Haven on 29 October 1951.  It then moved to the Colonial Theatre in Boston for three weeks beginning 6 November 1951 and then two weeks at the Forrest Theatre in Philadelphia beginning 29 November 1951.

Point of No Return ran at the Alvin theater (now the Neil Simon Theatre) from 13 December 1951 – 22 November 1952.

References

Internet Broadway Database

Broadway plays
1951 plays
Plays based on novels